Live at the Caravan of Dreams is an album by Ronald Shannon Jackson and The Decoding Society with Twins Seven Seven, recorded in 1985 at the Caravan of Dreams in Fort Worth, Texas, and released on the Caravan of Dreams label. The album was rereleased on CD in 1999 on Knit Classics as Beast in the Spider Bush: Live at the Caravan of Dreams.

Reception 

The AllMusic review by Thom Jurek stated: "The trademark harmolodic melody lines are present, but in the way of real group interplay and improvisation, there is little heat. Twins Seven Seven is a fantastic singing and drumming group; it would be a treat to hear them in some setting other than this one. As for the Decoding Society, it's clear that this was the beginning of the end creatively."

Track listing 
All compositions by Ronald Shannon Jackson.
 "The Ancient Voice of "E"" – 9:45
 "Dream Caravan" – 8:54 [titled African Seance" on reissue]
 "Ire (Eray)" – 9:04
 "Boiling Cabbage" – 11:18

Personnel 
Ronald Shannon Jackson – drums
Eric Person – alto saxophone, soprano saxophone
Akbar Ali – violin, barriphone
Cary Denigris – guitar
 Reginal Washington – electric bass
Twins Seven Seven – vocals, percussion, talking drum

References 

1986 live albums
Ronald Shannon Jackson live albums
Caravan of Dreams albums